Robbinsville is a town in Graham County, North Carolina, United States. The population was 597 at the 2020 census. It is the county seat of Graham County, county population 8,030.

Geography

Climate 
Robbinsville is categorized as being within the 7a USDA hardiness zone, meaning temperatures can get as low as 0 to 5 °F. The climate is humid subtropical (Cfa).

Demographics

2020 census

As of the 2020 United States census, there were 597 people, 317 households, and 156 families residing in the town.

2010 census
As of the 2010 Census, there were 411 people, 283 households and 157 families. The population density was 135 people per square mile.

2000 census
As of the census of 2000, there were 747 people, 346 households, and 207 families residing in the town. The population density was 1,663.4 people per square mile (640.9/km2). There were 393 housing units at an average density of 875.1 per square mile (337.2/km2). The racial makeup of the town was 94.38% White, 4.42% Native American, 0.54% from other races, and 0.67% from two or more races. Hispanic or Latino of any race were 0.67% of the population.

There were 346 households, out of which 27.5% had children under the age of 18 living with them, 39.6% were married couples living together, 16.5% had a female householder with no husband present, and 39.9% were non-families. 38.4% of all households were made up of individuals, and 19.7% had someone living alone who was 65 years of age or older. The average household size was 2.14 and the average family size was 2.85.

In the town, the population was spread out, with 24.8% under the age of 18, 10.4% from 18 to 24, 25.6% from 25 to 44, 21.2% from 45 to 64, and 18.1% who were 65 years of age or older. The median age was 37 years. For every 100 females, there were 92.5 males. For every 100 females age 18 and over, there were 80.1 males.

The median income for a household in the town was $14,688, and the median income for a family was $21,705. Males had a median income of $16,912 versus $14,886 for females. The per capita income for the town was $10,275.  About 26.5% of families and 34.5% of the population were below the poverty line, including 46.6% of those under the age of 18 and 37.8% of those 65 and older.

Cultural references
Segments of the motion picture The Fugitive (1993), starring Harrison Ford and Tommy Lee Jones, were filmed at Cheoah Dam close to Robbinsville.
Segments of the motion picture Nell (1994), starring Jodie Foster, were filmed in and around Robbinsville.
The title of the Avett Brothers album Four Thieves Gone: The Robbinsville Sessions refers to Robbinsville, North Carolina.
The silent film, Stark Love (2001), was filmed in and around Robbinsville and surrounding Graham County. Many of those who played in the movie were local residents.
Author Peter Jenkins wrote about events in 1974 in Robbinsville in his  book A Walk Across America. He left town after being threatened with lynching by local law enforcement because he was thought to be a hippie.
Robbinsville is featured frequently on the television show Moonshiners. It is the fictional home of Jim Tom, Jeff, Lance, and Mark.

Notable people
Junaluska, Cherokee Indian leader
Wade Crane, professional pool player, 8-Ball and 9-Ball Champion
Ronnie Milsap, country music singer and pianist
Rodney Orr, NASCAR driver
Tina Wesson, winner of Survivor: The Australian Outback

References

Further reading
 Jenkins, Peter (1979). A Walk Across America. Fawcett Crest. .

External links
Robbinsville North Carolina Profile with photos
Robbinsville North Carolina

Towns in Graham County, North Carolina
County seats in North Carolina